Brent Talley was a former Democratic member of the Arkansas House of Representatives, representing the 3rd district from 2013 to 2017.

References

External links
 
Legislative page

Living people
Democratic Party members of the Arkansas House of Representatives
Southern Arkansas University alumni
21st-century American politicians
Year of birth missing (living people)